Ndiaye is both a surname and a given name. Notable people with the name include:

 Adama Ndiaye, Senegalese fashion designer, also known as Adama Paris
 Aminata Mbengue Ndiaye, member of the Pan-African Parliament
 Amy Ndiaye, member of the Parliament of Senegal
 Awa Dioum-Ndiaye (born 1961), Senegalese track and field athlete
 Badara Ndiaye (born 1986), Senegalese visual concept developer and fashion designer
 Fatou Ndiaye Sow (1937–2004), Senegalese poet, teacher and children's writer
 Mamadou Bamba Ndiaye (1949–2020), Senegalese politician
 Marie NDiaye (born 1967), French novelist and playwright
 Papa Alioune Ndiaye (born 1990), Senegalese footballer

See also
 N'Diaye (disambiguation)
 Njie (disambiguation)

Surnames of Senegalese origin
Serer surnames